COPEI, also referred to as the Social Christian Party or Green Party, is a Christian democratic party in Venezuela. The acronym stands for Comité de Organización Política Electoral Independiente ("Independent Political Electoral Organization Committee"), but this provisional full name has fallen out of use. The party was influential during the twentieth century as a signatory of the Puntofijo Pact and influenced many politicians throughout Latin America at its peak.

History

20th century 
COPEI was founded on 13 January 1946 by Rafael Caldera. COPEI, Democratic Action (AD) and Democratic Republican Union (URD) signed the Puntofijo Pact in October 1958, establishing themselves as the dominant political parties in the country. Signatories and supporters of the Pact stated that it was created to preserve democracy and to share governorship between parties. Critics believed that the Pact allowed signing parties to limit control over Venezuela's government to themselves. URD would later leave the pact in 1962 following Cuba's removal from the Organization of American States, leaving governing of Venezuela to COPEI and AD. The Puntofijo system ultimately created a network of patronage for both parties.

Caldera was elected president in December 1968 and for the first time in Venezuela's history, opposition parties transferred power peacefully. COPEI was also the first Venezuelan political party to assume power peacefully on its first attempt. The only other COPEI member to become president of Venezuela was Luis Herrera Campins, from 1979 to 1983. However, Herrera Campins fell from grace due to a drop in oil revenue, leading to AD candidate Jaime Lusinchi winning the presidency in 1984.

Governing by COPEI and AD would continue through the rest of the century. Dissatisfaction with the established governmental system of patronage increased, culminating in the 1992 Venezuelan coup d'état attempts led by Hugo Chávez. For the 1993 Venezuelan general election, COPEI passed over choosing Caldera as their candidate. Caldera would afterwards win the election through his newly founded National Convergence party. Soon after being elected, Caldera freed Chávez, who became Caldera's successor following the 1998 Venezuelan presidential election.

21st century 
With the election of Chávez, Venezuela entered into a period of a dominant-party system led by his United Socialist Party of Venezuela (PSUV). In the 2000 legislative elections COPEI won a meager five of 165 seats in the National Assembly, with the party receiving 5.10% of valid votes. In the 2005 legislative elections COPEI staged an electoral boycott and did not win any seats in the National Assembly. In the 2010 parliamentary election, COPEI was part of the broad oppositional Coalition for Democratic Unity and won eight of the 165 seats.

Prior to the 2015 Venezuelan parliamentary election, the pro-government Supreme Tribunal of Justice designated new leaders of COPEI, leading some to state that the party was infiltrated by the PSUV. By 2017, Caracas Chronicles said the party was "dying an undignified death" as infighting among leaders could not agree on a path for the party.

Presidents of Venezuela

References

External links

 Official website

Political parties in Venezuela
Christian democratic parties in South America
Christian democratic parties in Venezuela
Political parties established in 1946
1946 establishments in Venezuela